Bullis is a surname. Notable people with the surname include:

Harry Amos Bullis (1890–1963), American businessman
John L. Bullis (1841–1911), Union Army soldier and businessman
Rush Bullis (1863–1946), American politician